"The Loneliness of the Long-Distance Runner" is a short story by Alan Sillitoe, published in 1959 as part of a short story collection of the same title. The work focuses on Smith, a poor Nottingham teenager from a dismal home in a working class area, who has bleak prospects in life and few interests beyond petty crime. The boy experiences social alienation and turns to long-distance running as a method of both emotional and physical escape from his situation. The story was adapted for a 1962 film of the same title.

Plot
When he is caught by the police for robbing a bakery, Smith is sentenced to be confined in Ruxton Towers in Essex, a borstal (young offenders institution) for delinquent youths. He seeks solace in long-distance running, attracting the notice of the school's authorities for his physical prowess. Smith is offered a light workload for his last six months at Ruxton Towers if he wins in an important cross-country competition against a prestigious public school. For Ruxton Towers to win the cross-country race would be a major public relations boost for the borstal administrators.

However, when the day of the race arrives Smith throws victory away: after speeding ahead of the other runners he deliberately stops a few metres short of the finishing line, though well ahead and easily able to win. He lets the other runners pass him and cross the finishing line, thereby losing the race in a defiant gesture aimed against his Ruxton Towers administrators. In deliberately losing the race, Smith demonstrates his free spirit and independence. The response of the borstal authorities to Smith's action is heavy-handed: Smith resigns himself to the drudgery of manual labour he is returned to. However, looking back on his actions, he has no regrets.

Literary analysis

The "runner" as a metaphor
Long-distance running gives the character an ability to escape from society without the pressures of a team, which may be found in other athletic stories. Additionally, Sillitoe gave running a political perspective that changed the vision of a literary runner. Sillitoe's character Smith uses running as a way to mentally reflect, allowing Smith to give clarity to his political insights and share them with the reader. Through running, Smith begins to understand and become aware of the class divisions in Britain.

During the period that Sillitoe wrote "The Loneliness of the Long Distance Runner" the idea of the runner was changing dramatically. Helen Small states, "…the weight of literary attention seems to be focused on a 'pre-professional era'—either written at that time or looking back at it for inspiration".

The "Angry Young Men" and Sillitoe 

Many critics and colleagues of Alan Sillitoe regard him as a member of the "Angry Young Men" movement, though Sillitoe himself disliked the label. It was associated with writers who created "belligerent and opinionated" characters, and "The Loneliness of the Long Distance Runner" suggests a confrontation with the class issues of the time. Smith says "in the end the governor is going to be doomed while blokes like me will take the pickings of his roasted bones and dance like maniacs around his Borstal's ruins". It has been suggested that Sillitoe was never simply an "Angry Young Man" but had a deep and abiding hatred for the British class system, and that his and Smith's views were not very different.

References in culture

Music

 In 1986, the American jazz saxophone player David Liebman composed a whole suite on his album "The loneliness of a long distance runner" inspired by Alan Silitoe book
The British heavy metal group Iron Maiden adapted the short story into the song of the same name on their Somewhere in Time album.  
British Oi! and punk band the Angelic Upstarts included a song of the same name on their Reason Why? album.  
Scottish indie group Belle and Sebastian adapted the title for the song "Loneliness of a Middle Distance Runner," a B-side on their 2001 single "Jonathan David" which also appears on the critically acclaimed compilation Push Barman to Open Old Wounds.
Grindcore band Agoraphobic Nosebleed parodied the title with "The Loneliness of the Long Distance Drug Runner" from their album Agorapocalypse.
Leeds anarchist pop band Chumbawamba samples audio from the film heavily in the song "Alright Now" on the unreleased album Jesus H. Christ.
The American post-hardcore band Fugazi adapted the title for the song "Long Distance Runner" from their album Red Medicine.
The Psychobilly band the Meteors reference the title in the name of the song "The Loneliness of the Long Distance Killer" on their These Evil Things album.
 Canadian rapper Buck 65 references the title in the song "Blood of a Young Wolf" with the lyrics "Lonely like the tight rope walker, hitchhiker, long distance runner."
 Charlottesville, Virginia (US) band September '67 performed "Loneliness of the Long Distance Runner" for Lilith Fair 1997
Hardcore punk band This Routine is Hell entitled a song on their 2012 EP Repent. Repeat. "The Loneliness of the Long Distance Runner".
British rock band Foals included the title of the book in their song "The Runner", a lead single from their 2019 album Everything Not Saved Will Be Lost – Part 2.
 Spanish rap group Los Chikos del Maíz named a single after the title of the book in 2016.
 A frame from the film was used on the cover of Velvet Rye's single "Isolated Nation".

Television
Series 2 of the BBC sitcom Dad's Army included an episode titled "The Loneliness of the Long Distance Walker", the title being a play on words between the book and the Dad's Army character Private Walker.

Politics
On 9 January 2009, impeached Illinois Gov. Rod Blagojevich referred to the story: "Let me simply say, I feel like the old Alan Sillitoe short story 'The Loneliness of the Long Distance Runner'... and that's what this is, by the way, a long-distance run."

Literature
Steve Wozniak, co-founder of Apple Inc., mentions in his book iWoz about how much he thinks like Smith and was influenced by Sillitoe's story.

Adrian Tomine, wrote a graphic novel about the isolation he feels as consequence of his solitary profession called The Loneliness of the Long-Distance Cartoonist.

References

1959 short stories
Running books
British short stories
Social realism
Nottinghamshire in fiction
Essex in fiction
Short stories adapted into films
W. H. Allen & Co. books
British works adapted into films